Shrubland, scrubland, scrub, brush, or bush is a plant community characterized by vegetation dominated by shrubs, often also including grasses, herbs, and geophytes. Shrubland may either occur naturally or be the result of human activity. It may be the mature vegetation type in a particular region and remain stable over time, or a transitional community that occurs temporarily as the result of a disturbance, such as fire.  A stable state may be maintained by regular natural disturbance such as fire or browsing.  Shrubland may be unsuitable for human habitation because of the danger of fire. The term was coined in 1903.

Shrubland species generally show a wide range of adaptations to fire, such as heavy seed production, lignotubers, and fire-induced germination.

Botanical structural form 
In botany and ecology a shrub is defined as a much-branched woody plant less than 8 m high and usually with many stems. Tall shrubs are mostly 2–8 m high, small shrubs 1–2 m high and subshrubs less than 1 m high.

There is a descriptive system widely adopted in Australia to describe different types of vegetation is based on structural characteristics based on plant life-form, plus the  height and foliage cover of the tallest stratum or dominant species.

For shrubs 2–8 m high the following structural forms result:
 dense foliage cover (70–100%) — closed-scrub
 mid-dense foliage cover (30–70%) — open-scrub
 very sparse foliage cover (<10%) — tall open shrubland

For shrubs <2 m high the following structural forms result:
 dense foliage cover (70–100%) — closed-heath
 mid-dense foliage cover (30–70%) — open-heath
 sparse foliage cover (10–30%) — low shrubland
 very sparse foliage cover (<10%) — low open shrubland

Biome plant group 

Similarly, shrubland is a category used to describe a  type of biome plant group. In this context, shrublands are dense thickets of evergreen sclerophyll shrubs and small trees, called:
 Chaparral in California
 Matorral in Chile, Mexico, and Spain
 Maquis in France and elsewhere around the Mediterranean
 Macchia in Italy
 Fynbos in South Africa
 Eastern Suburbs Banksia Scrub in Sydney
 Kwongan in Southwest Australia
 Cedar scrub in Texas Hill Country

In some places shrubland is the mature vegetation type, and in other places the result of degradation of former forest or woodland by logging or overgrazing, or disturbance by major fires.

A number of World Wildlife Fund biomes are characterized as shrublands, including:

Desert scrublands

Xeric or desert scrublands occur in the world's deserts and xeric shrublands ecoregions, or in areas of fast-draining sandy soils in more humid regions. These scrublands are characterized by plants with adaptations to the dry climate, which include small leaves to limit water loss, thorns to protect them from grazing animals, succulent leaves or stems, storage organs to store water, and long taproots to reach groundwater.

Mediterranean scrublands
Mediterranean scrublands occur naturally in the Mediterranean forests, woodlands, and scrub biomes, located in the five Mediterranean climate regions of the world. Scrublands are most common near the seacoast, and have often adapted to the wind and salt air of the ocean. Low, soft-leaved scrublands around the Mediterranean Basin are known as garrigue in France, phrygana in Greece, tomillares in Spain, and batha in Israel. Northern coastal scrub and coastal sage scrub occur along the California coast, strandveld in the Western Cape of South Africa, coastal matorral in central Chile, and sand-heath and kwongan in Southwest Australia.

Interior scrublands
Interior scrublands occur naturally in semi-arid areas where soils are nutrient-poor, such as on the matas of Portugal which are underlain by Cambrian and Silurian schists. Florida scrub is another example of interior scrublands.

Dwarf shrubs

Some vegetation types are formed of dwarf-shrubs: low-growing or creeping shrubs.  These include the maquis and garrigues of Mediterranean climates, and the acid-loving dwarf shrubs of heathland and moorland.

See also 
 Fynbos
 Maquis
 Prostrate shrub
 Semi-desert
 Shrub-steppe
 Shrub swamp
 Moorland

Notes and references

External links